This list of buildings and structures in Como lists palaces, monuments, churches and buildings of Como.

External links 
 

Como